Rolandas Pavilionis (July 3, 1944, Šiauliai – May 10, 2006, Vilnius) was a Lithuanian philosopher, politician and Member of the European Parliament (MEP) for the Liberal Democratic Party; part of the Union for a Europe of Nations.

Biography
In 1962 Pavilionis graduated from a night-school for workers in Šiauliai. He attended the school at night after finishing his work at a bicycle factory. The same year he was admitted to the Vilnius University to study foreign languages. In 1968 he graduated the university with a degree in philology. From 1968 to 1971 he continued postgraduate studies at the Science Academy of Ukraine and earned doctor's degree in logic. Pavilionis then returned to Lithuania and joined Vilnius University as member of the faculty (1971–1977 docent, 1982–1990 professor). For some time he was the head of the Department of History of Philosophy and Logic.

Pavilionis took courses at the Sorbonne University of Paris with prof. Algirdas Julius Greimas. In 1981 Pavilionis defended his thesis in the field of language logic and philosophy of logic, earning degree of Habilitated Doctor of Logic.

In 1990 Pavilionis was elected as the rector of the Vilnius University. He held the post until 2000, when was elected to Seimas (parliament). In 2004, he was elected to the European Parliament.

In 2006 he died in Santariškės hospital, Vilnius.

Works
Pavilionis was the author of works in Russian, Lithuanian and English.

„Язык и логика“, 1975,
„Kalba. Logika. Filosofija“, Vilnius: Mintis, 1981.
„Проблема смысла: современный логико-философский анализ языка“, Москва: Мысль, 1983.
„Meaning and conceptual systems“, Moscow: Progress, 1990.
„Prieš absurdą“, 2000.
„Tarp šviesos ir tamsos“, 2000.
„Prieš absurdą II“, 2004.
„Prasmė ir tapatumas, arba kelionė į save“, Vilnius: Lietuvos mokslas, 2005.

1944 births
2006 deaths
Order and Justice MEPs
MEPs for Lithuania 2004–2009
Rectors of Vilnius University
Vilnius University alumni
People from Šiauliai
Logicians
20th-century Lithuanian philosophers
Philosophy of logic
Philosophers of language
Members of the European Academy of Sciences and Arts
Members of the Seimas